Scouleriaceae is a family of haplolepideous mosses (Dicranidae) in the order Scouleriales. It comprises two genera, Scouleria and Tridontium.

References

Moss families
Bryopsida